Basavaraj Bommai ministry is the current Cabinet of Karnataka headed by the Chief Minister of Karnataka, Basavaraj Bommai.

Council of Ministers

|}
Source:

District Wise break up

See also
 Karnataka Legislative Assembly

References

Cabinets established in 2021
2021 establishments in Karnataka
Karnataka ministries
Lists of current Indian state and territorial ministries
Bharatiya Janata Party state ministries
2021 in Indian politics
Current governments